Ballia Lok Sabha constituency is one of the 80 Lok Sabha (parliamentary) constituencies in the state of Uttar Pradesh in northern India. It is famous for its political history and participation of former PM Chandra Shekhar in JP Andolan, India.

Assembly segments
Presently, Ballia Lok Sabha constituency comprises six Vidhan Sabha (legislative assembly) segments. These are:

Members of Parliament

^ by poll

Election results

General election 2019

General election 2014

See also
 Ballia district
 List of Constituencies of the Lok Sabha

Notes

External links
Ballia lok sabha  constituency election 2019 result details
Ballia Lok Sabha

Lok Sabha constituencies in Uttar Pradesh
Ballia district